Guilherme de Cássio Alves (born 8 May 1974), sometimes known as just Guilherme, is a Brazilian football coach and former player who played as a striker. He is the current manager of Marília.

In his country, he played with eight clubs with different fortunes, and also competed professionally in Spain and Saudi Arabia during a 13-year career. Over the course of 11 Série A seasons, he amassed totals of 155 games and 68 goals.

Guilherme Alves appeared with the Brazil national team at the 2001 Copa América. In 2011, he started working as a manager.

Club career
Born in Marília, São Paulo, Guilherme Alves started his professional career at age 18 with local Marília Atlético Clube. After a few games, São Paulo FC manager Telê Santana signed him, and he played a relatively important part in the club's conquests in the following two years: the Supercopa Sudamericana, the Copa Libertadores, the Intercontinental Cup, the Copa CONMEBOL and the Recopa Sudamericana.

In January 1995, Guilherme Alves left for Spain and joined Rayo Vallecano, scoring 14 goals in only 17 matches (half-a-season) as the team achieved promotion to La Liga. During the following two campaigns, he continued to net in double digits, but they returned to the second division at the end of the latter.

In 1997, Guilherme Alves returned to his country with Grêmio Foot-Ball Porto Alegrense. In the following year he moved to CR Vasco da Gama, where he was very rarely played, but also helped to the Torneio Rio – São Paulo conquest.

Still in 1999, Guilherme Alves signed with Clube Atlético Mineiro, where he experienced his best years as a professional. In the year's Série A, he was crowned top scorer by breaking the record which belonged to club legend Reinaldo, and led the team to the vice-championship.

Guilherme Alves played one year on loan with Sport Club Corinthians Paulista, scoring twice in his debut, a 3–2 home win against Sport Club Internacional. However, his stay was marred by a serious car accident which resulted in the death of two persons. He never regained his previous form with Corinthians, and after leaving Atlético for good (with a total of 139 official goals), represented Ittihad FC of Saudi Arabia.

In the year 2004, Guilherme Alves signed for Cruzeiro Esporte Clube, scoring 13 goals in 50 competitive games and helping the team to the Campeonato Mineiro. He finished his career in the following year, with Botafogo de Futebol e Regatas; he suffered a serious injury while at the service of the latter and, whilst recovering from his condition at Corinthians, severely hurt his thigh and decided to end his career, at 31.

In the beginning of 2007, Guilherme Alves served as first club Marília's director of football, with the side in the Série B. He subsequently joined another former team, Atlético Mineiro, being named assistant coach alongside Nei Pandolfo and Freddy Rincón.

On 15 February 2011, Guilherme Alves was hired as Ipatinga Futebol Clube's manager. On 21 June 2013, after a successful spell at Marília Atlético Clube, he was named coach at Grêmio Novorizontino, being crowned champions of the following year's Campeonato Paulista Série A3.

After achieving a first ever promotion to the Campeonato Paulista in 2015, Guilherme Alves was appointed at the helm of Vila Nova Futebol Clube on 14 June 2016.

International career
Courtesy of his solid Atlético performances, Guilherme Alves played a total of six matches with Brazil, his debut coming in 2000. He was called up for the squad which represented the nation in the following year's Copa América, scoring in a 2–0 group stage win against Peru in an eventual quarter-final exit.

International goals

Honours

Player
São Paulo
Copa Libertadores: 1993
Supercopa Libertadores: 1993
Recopa Sudamericana: 1993, 1994
Copa CONMEBOL: 1994

Vasco da Gama
Torneio Rio – São Paulo: 1999

Atlético Mineiro
Campeonato Mineiro: 1999, 2000

Cruzeiro
Campeonato Mineiro: 2004

Manager
Novorizontino
Campeonato Paulista Série A3: 2014

References

External links

1974 births
Living people
People from Marília
Brazilian footballers
Association football forwards
Campeonato Brasileiro Série A players
Marília Atlético Clube players
São Paulo FC players
Grêmio Foot-Ball Porto Alegrense players
CR Vasco da Gama players
Clube Atlético Mineiro players
Sport Club Corinthians Paulista players
Cruzeiro Esporte Clube players
Botafogo de Futebol e Regatas players
La Liga players
Segunda División players
Rayo Vallecano players
Saudi Professional League players
Ittihad FC players
Brazil international footballers
2001 Copa América players
Copa Libertadores-winning players
Brazilian expatriate footballers
Expatriate footballers in Spain
Expatriate footballers in Saudi Arabia
Brazilian expatriate sportspeople in Spain
Brazilian football managers
Campeonato Brasileiro Série B managers
Ipatinga Futebol Clube managers
Marília Atlético Clube managers
Grêmio Novorizontino managers
Vila Nova Futebol Clube managers
Clube Atlético Linense managers
Associação Portuguesa de Desportos managers
Paysandu Sport Club managers
Footballers from São Paulo (state)